The Lopez Center is a proposed building that will rise at a one-hectare area at JP Rizal, Rockwell Center, Makati. It was launched in 2008 as a mixed-use building that has 50 floors. It would be the future headquarters of several companies owned by the Lopez family. The tower is named after Manolo Lopez, the owner and developer of the Rockwell Center. It is expected to be the tallest building in the Philippines once completed. It is designed after the new One World Trade Center in New York City. One of its earlier designs included a crown on top but it was later changed to a new and better design. It was supposed to begin construction in 2007 but was delayed. The office space is planned to be operational in 2011.

Construction began on the Lopez Tower and Museum on 26 April 2012.  The 19 storey tower designed by Larry Oltmanns of Vx3 Architects.Strategists.Urban Designers is scheduled to be completed by 2014 when it will house the offices of the Lopez Holding Companies and the Lopez Museum. The design of the tower is a part of four interlocking pillars representing the entrepreneurship, integrity, leadership and public service of the Lopez family. The Tower is being designed to achieve LEED Gold Certification.

Companies involved
 Skidmore, Owings & Merrill LLP 
 Rockwell Land Corporation
 Alan G. Davenport Wind Engineering Group BLWTL.
 Larry Oltmanns of Vx3 Architects.Strategists.Urban Designers

See also
 List of tallest buildings in Metro Manila

References

External links
Lopez Center Tower- Philippine-Builder

Skyscrapers in Makati
Proposed buildings and structures in Metro Manila
Skyscraper office buildings in Metro Manila
Skidmore, Owings & Merrill buildings